Colonel Sir Oliver Crosthwaite-Eyre (14 October 1913 – 3 February 1978) was a British Conservative Party politician.

The elder son of Major John Symons Crosthwaite (later Crosthwaite-Eyre) of Glaschville, Knoydart, Inverness-shire by his wife Dorothy Muriel, the daughter and heiress of George Edward Briscoe Eyre, of Warrens House, Wiltshire, he was granted his maternal grandfather's estate by his mother in 1947. Educated at Downside School and Trinity College, Cambridge, he attained the rank of Colonel in the Royal Marines in 1945, following which he embarked upon a political career. At the 1945 general election was elected as Member of Parliament for the New Forest and Christchurch constituency, and was re-elected in 1950 for the new New Forest constituency. He held the seat until his resignation from the House of Commons in 1968. Following a longstanding family tradition, Sir Oliver spent much of his time involving himself with the New Forest.

He married, in 1939, Baroness Maria Alexandra, the daughter of Baron Heinrich von Puthon, of Schloss Mirabel, Salzburg, and had two sons (Anthony and John) and three daughters (Phillipa, Mary and Loelia).

References
http://discovery.nationalarchives.gov.uk/details/r/C1453800

External links 
 

1913 births
1978 deaths
Conservative Party (UK) MPs for English constituencies
UK MPs 1945–1950
UK MPs 1950–1951
UK MPs 1951–1955
UK MPs 1955–1959
UK MPs 1959–1964
UK MPs 1964–1966
UK MPs 1966–1970
Royal Marines personnel of World War II
Royal Marines officers
Knights Bachelor
Alumni of Trinity College, Cambridge
People educated at Downside School